The imperial cave salamander, imperial salamander,  odorous cave salamander, or scented cave salamander (Speleomantes imperialis) is a species of salamander in the family Plethodontidae. It is endemic to Sardinia.

Habitat and conservation
It lays a few terrestrial eggs that have direct development (i.e., there is no free-living larval stage). While common within its limited range and not facing major threats, it can suffer localized habitat loss and illegal collection. It occurs in the National Park of the Gulf of Orosei and Gennargentu and the Monte Sette Fratelli Regional Park, probably also the Giara di Gesturi Regional Park.

References

External links
 ARKive

Speleomantes
Amphibians of Europe
Endemic fauna of Sardinia
Cave salamanders
Amphibians described in 1969
Taxonomy articles created by Polbot